Marcello Pelillo from the University of Venice, Venezia Mestre, Italy was named Fellow of the Institute of Electrical and Electronics Engineers (IEEE) in 2013 for contributions to graph-theoretic and optimization-based approaches in pattern recognition and computer vision.

References 

Fellow Members of the IEEE
Living people
Year of birth missing (living people)
Place of birth missing (living people)